On February 29, 1824, Representative William Lee Ball (DR) of  died in office.  A special election was held to fill the resulting vacancy.

Election results

See also
List of special elections to the United States House of Representatives

References

Special elections to the 18th United States Congress
1824
Virginia 1824 13
1824 Virginia elections
Virginia 13
United States House of Representatives 1824 13